Andrews Tavern is an historic building located in Spotsylvania County, Virginia. The original building was constructed for Samuel Andrews in 1815. Around 1848, a frame wing was added to the brick structure for a tavern. Though the wing was added to the original residence, there is no interior connection between the two.
The tavern is an example of Federal provincial architecture.

In 1778, the county seat of Spotsylvania County was moved to Andrews Tavern area which was a central location in the county. The county seat remained at Andrews Tavern until it was moved to its present location at Spotsylvania Court House in 1839.

Since the construction of the building, it has served a number of purposes including United States Post Office (1842–1862) and, during the American Civil War, Confederate post office (1862–1865). During his ownership of the building, Samuel Andrews was postmaster for the governments of both the Confederate States of America and the United States. The building has also served as a school and a polling place. The location of the tavern, near the intersection of two major roads, made it a central social and political gathering place. Both the Whigs and the Democrats promoted their parties on election days in the 1840s with parades, banners, and free whiskey for voters.

In 1885, the building once again housed a post office. As of 1999, Andrews Tavern was a private residence.

The property has been designated as a Virginia Historic Landmark and was added to the National Register of Historic Places in July 1976.

References

Further reading
 Andrew's Tavern NRHP Nomination Form (1976)

Commercial buildings on the National Register of Historic Places in Virginia
Federal architecture in Virginia
Commercial buildings completed in 1815
Buildings and structures in Spotsylvania County, Virginia
Taverns in Virginia
Drinking establishments on the National Register of Historic Places in Virginia
National Register of Historic Places in Spotsylvania County, Virginia
1815 establishments in Virginia